David Inyene-Obong Oluwaseun Hundeyin is a controversial Nigerian journalist and author. He has written one opinion article on CNN and Arbiterz. He founded the West Africa Weekly, a Substack blog.

Education 
Hundeyin attended his primary at Corona School Gbagada, Lagos, and Atlantic Hall School, Maryland, Lagos & Grange School, Lagos for his secondary school. He attended Igbinedion University where he studied Mass Communication.

Dismissal from Cambridge 
In 2022, Hundeyin was announced as The Distinguished James Currey Fellow for 2023, a program founded by Onyeka Nwelue and domiciled at The University of Cambridge, as an academic visitor to the Centre of African Studies. In March 2023, Hundeyin was dismissed from the program after an investigation to his conduct with Nwelue, during a recent book launch. While Nwelue was accused of misrepresenting himself as an Oxford University professor even though he was an unpaid Academic Visitor, using the logo of the universities on personal projects, and for charging students money for attending events that should have been free, among others Hundeyin was accused by attendees of the event as being misogynistic and sexist which 'made them feel "incredibly uncomfortable"' He was also accused of parading himself as a fellow of Cambridge University, even though he was just an academic visitor under Nwelue's now discredited fellowship scheme.

Hundeyin later wrote on twitter accusing Governor Nasir el-Rufai of Kaduna state, without proof, of being behind his dismissal although other organisations in the past (like International Center for Journalists and PEN America) had condemned him for violent incitement and harassment of the survivors of sexual violence.

Awards and recognition 
• Royal Commonwealth Society "Write Around The World" Award Winner, 2006

• Nominee, Edward Murrow Program for Journalists, 2018

• People Journalism Prize for Africa, 2020

• Fellow, 2021

• GRC & Anti-Financial Crime Reporter of the Year, 2021

• Special Letter of Recommendations Issued by Narendra Modi, Prime Minister of the Republic of India, 2022

• Sigma Awards 2022 Shortlist Issued by Sigma Awards Prize for Data Journalism, 2022

• Nominee Issued by Sheikh Tamim bin Hamad Al Thani International Anti-Corruption Excellence Award, 2022

• Most Outstanding Young Person in Journalism Issued by Lagos Youth Award, 2022

• Governance Risk Compliance (GRC) & Financial Crime Prevention Reporter of the Year, 2022

• 100 Most Influential Africa, 2020

• The Distinguished James Currey Fellowship, 2023 - Fraudulent Award - University of Oxford

References 

Nigerian investigative journalists
Nigerian writers
Living people
Year of birth missing (living people)